Batocera wallacei, common name Wallace's long-horn beetle, is a species of flat-faced longhorn beetle in the subfamily Lamiinae of the family Cerambycidae. The species name honors Alfred Russel Wallace, who discovered this longhorn beetle on the Aru Islands in Indonesia. It was named after him by James Thomson in 1858.

Description
The basic colour of the body is greenish-brownish or grey with whitish dorsal patches on the elytra. The larvae are nearly four inches long.

Distribution
This quite common species can be found in Australia (Queensland), Papua New Guinea and the Moluccas (Aru Island, Kei Island) .

Gallery

References
   Biolib
  W. J. Rainbow - Larva and Pupa of Batocera Wallacei, Thoms - Records of the Australian Museum
 James Thomson  Archives entomologiques, ou, Recueil contenant des illustrations d'insectes nouveaux ou rares (1857)

External links
  wallacei Cerambycoidea
  Wallace Fund

Batocerini
Beetles described in 1858
Beetles of Australia
Beetles of Oceania